Laxmipur (Sl. No.: 141) is a Vidhan Sabha constituency of Koraput district, Odisha.

This constituency includes Laxmipur block, Dasamanthapur block, Bandhugaob block and Narayanpatana block.

In 2014 election, Indian National Congress Kailash Chandra Kulesika won from this Constituency.

Elected Members

Eleven elections were held between 1974 and 2014 including one by-election in 2008.
Elected members from the Laxmipur constituency are:
2014: (141): Kailash Chandra Kulesika, (INC) 
2009: (141): Jhina Hikaka (BJD)
2008: (By Poll): Purna Chandra Majhi (Congress)
2004: (83): Anantaram Majhi  (Congress)
2000: (83): Bibhisana Majhi (BJD)
1995: (83): Anantaram Majhi  (Congress)
1990: (83): Akhilla Saunta (Janata Dal
1985: (83): Anantaram Majhi (Congress)
1980: (83): Anantaram Majhi (Congress-I)
1977: (83): Akhili Saunta (Janata Party)
1974: (83): Anantaram Majhi (Congress)

2019 Election Result

2014 Election

Summary of results of the 2009 Election

Notes

References

Assembly constituencies of Odisha
Koraput district